Dmitri Shitikov (born January 21, 1986) is a Russian professional ice hockey forward who is currently an unrestricted free agent. He most recently played for HC Vityaz of the Kontinental Hockey League (KHL).

References

External links

1986 births
Living people
Amur Khabarovsk players
HC Dynamo Moscow players
People from Tyumen
Severstal Cherepovets players
SKA Saint Petersburg players
HC Sibir Novosibirsk players
HC Vityaz players
HK Poprad players
Russian ice hockey right wingers
Sportspeople from Tyumen Oblast
Russian expatriate ice hockey people
Russian expatriate sportspeople in Kazakhstan
Russian expatriate sportspeople in Belarus
Russian expatriate sportspeople in Slovakia
Expatriate ice hockey players in Slovakia
Expatriate ice hockey players in Belarus
Expatriate ice hockey players in Kazakhstan